Don't Stop the Revolution is the second and last album by New Zealand band, Breathe, released in 2000.

Track listing
She Said
Don't Stop The Revolution
Landslide
Wrapped Up
Sick & Tired
Get Yourself Together
When The Sun Comes
Perfect Fools
Let Them Know
Too Late For Salvation
In The City

Bonus Music Videos
Don't Stop the Revolution
When the Sun Comes

2000 albums
Breathe (New Zealand band) albums